James McKeehan (born August 9, 1973) is a former American football tight end. He played for the Houston Oilers in 1996 and for the Tennessee Oilers in 1997.

References

1973 births
Living people
American football tight ends
Texas A&M Aggies football players
Houston Oilers players
Tennessee Oilers players